Rapalje is a Dutch Celtic folk band which performs Irish, Scottish and Dutch folk music and sings in English as well as in Dutch. The band consists of William van der Laan, David Myles, and Marcel "Maceál" Meijer. Former member Dieb den Boer left the band in April 2022.

Recordings 
The band recorded 10 CD's, of which 3 were later compiled into 1 album, and 1 DVD.

 1998: Into Folk
 2000: Rakish Paddies (the compiled album)
 2001: Alesia
 2004: Spades / Schoppen
 2004: Diamonds / Ruiten
 2007: Celtic Fire (live recordings in theatres)
 2008: Live DVD
 2010: Double live CD
 2012: Clubs
 2014: Hearts
 2019: Scotland's Story

References

External links
Website of Rapalje (WebCite archive)
Rapalje at Discogs
Rapalje at Last.fm
(Dutch) Mention in the Muziekencyclopedie of the Muziek Centrum Nederland
(German) Rapalje stehen viereinhalb Stunden auf der Bühne, Nordwest-Zeitung, November 6, 2007
(German) "Rapalje" hüllte sich in dichte Nebelschwaden, Ostfriesen-Zeitung, Karin Eden, January 17, 2011

Dutch folk music groups
Celtic music groups